Benoît Van Uytvanck (25 June 1857 – 6 November 1927) was a Belgian sculptor.

Life and work
Van Uytvanck was born on 25 June 1857 in Hamme, East Flanders, Belgium.

He was a pupil of Jean-Baptiste Bethune. He became a sculptor chiefly of religious subjects. Van Uytvanck also worked as a restorer of sculptures. As such he was most active in the churches in Leuven and Mechelen. His work was often discussed in the Bulletin des Métiers d'Art. His style has been described as a "sober and less dogmatic interpretation of the Gothic Revival". In 1903 he completed an ornate tabernacle (Sacramentstoren) in white stone, as well statues of Mary and Saint John  and an altarpiece of Saint Anne in polychrome wood for the Onze-Lieve-Vrouw-over-de-Dijlekerk of Mechelen. In 1909 he completed a Neo-Gothic altarpiece of The Seven Sorrows of Our Lady for the same church.

He had an atelier in Leuven, dealing mainly with church furnishings.

Gallery

References

External links
 Van Uytvanck at Inventaris Vlaanderen
 Van Uytvanck at Oxford Art Online

1857 births
1927 deaths
19th-century Belgian sculptors
19th-century Belgian male artists
People from Hamme